Kimmelman is an occupational surname of Jewish origin. Notable people with this name include:

 Burt Kimmelman (born 1947), Jewish-American poet and scholar noted for his criticism of modern American poetry.
Gene Kimmelman (born c. 1945), American attorney and consumer advocate
 Irwin I. Kimmelman (1930–2014), Attorney General of New Jersey from 1982 – 1986.
 Michael Kimmelman (born 1958), pianist, author, critic and columnist for the New York Times

See also

References 

Jewish surnames
Germanic-language surnames